The New York Peacock is a 1917 American silent crime drama film directed by Kenean Buel. Distributed by Fox Film Corporation, the film starred Valeska Suratt. It is now considered lost.

Cast
Valeska Suratt as Zena
Harry Hilliard as Billy Martin
Eric Mayne as Mr. Martin
Alice Gale as The Mother
Claire Whitney as Billy's Wife
William Black as Graham (credited as W.W. Black)
John Mackin as Miller
Frank Goldsmith as Durrant

See also
1937 Fox vault fire

References

External links
 
 

1917 films
1917 crime drama films
Lost crime drama films
Fox Film films
American crime drama films
American silent feature films
American black-and-white films
Lost American films
Films directed by Kenean Buel
1917 lost films
1910s American films
Silent American drama films